Table tennis at the 2018 Summer Youth Olympics was held from 7 to 15 October. The competition took place at the Tecnópolis in Buenos Aires, Argentina.

Qualification

Each National Olympic Committee (NOC) can enter a maximum of 2 competitors, 1 per each gender. As hosts, Argentina is given the maximum quota should they not qualify an athlete and a further 4 spots, 2 in each gender, will be allocated by the Tripartite Commission. The remaining 58 places shall be decided in three qualification phases; the six continental qualification tournaments, the six “Road to Buenos Aires” events and the Under-18 World Rankings.

To be eligible to participate at the Youth Olympics athletes must have been born between 1 January 2000 and 31 December 2003.

Boys

Girls

Medal summary

Medal table

Events

References

External links
Official Results Book – Table tennis

 
2018 Summer Youth Olympics events
Youth Summer Olympics
2018